Yelena Gruzinova-Bronyukova (born December 24, 1967) is a retired female race walker from Russia. She competed for her native country at the 1996 Summer Olympics.

Achievements

References
sports-reference

1967 births
Living people
Russian female racewalkers
Athletes (track and field) at the 1996 Summer Olympics
Olympic athletes of Russia
20th-century Russian women